King Wu of Chu (died 690 BC) was the first king of the State of Chu during the Spring and Autumn period of ancient China. He was the second son of Xiao'ao, and brother of former ruler Fenmao whom he is rumored to have murdered in 740 BC in order to usurp the throne. He was also the first ruler among Zhou's vassal states to style himself "king"; Chu was one of a few states where  local rulers declared themselves kings during the Spring and Autumn period. Other states include Wu and Yue.

Life
King Wu married a daughter of the ruler of Deng called Deng Man and installed Dou Bobi, son of Ruo'ao as Prime Minister and his son Qu Xia as Mo'ao.

With the power of Chu growing by the day, King Wu became dissatisfied with the title of Viscount and sought to better himself. In the summer of the thirty-seventh year of his reign, 704 BCE, at the time of King Huan of Zhou, he invited the leaders of the other vassal states to a meeting at Shenlu. The states of Ba, Pu, Deng, Jiao, Luo, Zhen, Shen, Er, Yun and Jiang all sent representatives with only the States of Huang and Sui not in attendance. King Wu's minister Wei Zhang was dispatched to Huang to criticize their non-attendance whilst the King and Qu Xia led an army to attack the State of Sui. Sui was overthrown at the Battle of Suqi. The state's leader fled whilst Chu Minister Dou Dan captured the Marquess of Sui's chariot along with the chariot division military commander. Thereafter, Sui did not act rashly again. Xiong Che declared himself “King”, marking Chu's formal independence from the Zhou Dynasty. Subsequent rulers of Chu would all style themselves “King”, heralding the start of the vassal kingdoms’ usurpation of Zhou supremacy and the decline of the House of Zhou.

In 700 BCE, the forty-first year of his reign, the Chu army defeated the State of Jiao which subsequently became a vassal of Chu. The following year, King Wu sent his son Qu Xia to attack the State of Luo. Qu Xiao underestimated the enemy and became trapped between Lu Nomads and the Luo army on the borders of the state. Qu Xia suffered a major defeat and fled with his remaining troops to Huangyu where he hanged himself. King Wu took responsibility for the defeat and pardoned all remaining soldiers who had taken part in the battle, although he already ordered the amputation of their right feet. In 690 BCE, King Wu led his troops on a punitive expedition into the State of Sui. After crossing the Han River and arriving on the eastern bank, he was suddenly taken ill. He sat down under a tree and died not long afterwards. The Chu Prime Minister Dou Qi, son of Dou Dan did not hold a funeral, but instead led the Chu army on the advance westward as originally planned. When the Chu army arrived at the capital of the State of Sui, its rulers capitulated and swore allegiance to Chu. The Chu army withdrew across the Han River where they held a funeral for the late king. Thereafter, his son Xiong Zi ascended the throne as King Wen of Chu.

Issue
 Qu Xia
 King Wen of Chu
 Prince Ziyuan

References

Notes

This article is partly based on a translation of 楚武王 in Chinese Wikipedia. 

Monarchs of Chu (state)
Chinese kings
8th-century BC Chinese monarchs
7th-century BC Chinese monarchs
690 BC deaths
Year of birth unknown